Bruce Peter Weitz (born May 27, 1943) is an American actor who is perhaps best known for his role as Sgt. Michael "Mick" Belker in the TV series Hill Street Blues, which ran from 1981 until 1987. Weitz won an Emmy Award for Outstanding Supporting Actor in a Drama Series in 1984 for his role in the series.

Biography

Early life
Weitz was born in Norwalk, Connecticut, the son of Sybil (née Rubel), a homemaker, and Joseph Weitz, who owned a liquor store.

Career
Weitz appeared in the movies Deep Impact, Half Past Dead and El Cortez. His guest appearances on television include NYPD Blue, Quincy, Midnight Caller, Sisters, Superman: The Animated Series as Bruno Mannheim, JAG, The X-Files, The West Wing, and Highlander: The Series. Weitz portrayed Anthony Zacchara on General Hospital from 2007 to 2012.

Personal life
Weitz married actress Cecilia Hart in 1971; they divorced in 1980. Weitz has been married to Vivian Davis since 1986; they have one son. In 2001, Weitz was named honorary mayor of Reseda, Los Angeles.

Selected filmography
 2013 The Young and the Restless as Barry
 2009 Imps* as Larry
 2008 CSI (Ep. "The Happy Place") as Leon Slocomb
 2008 Quality Time as Jack Savage
 2008 Triloquist as voice of Dummy
 2007-2012 General Hospital as Anthony Zacchara
 2007 Dexter (Ep. "Morning Comes") as Lenny Asher
 2007 The Dukes as Toulio
 2006 Though None Go with Me as Will Bishop
 2005 Ghost Whisperer (Ep. "Lost Boys") as Tobias Northrop
 2005 Grey's Anatomy (Ep. "If Tomorrow Never Comes") as Edward Levangie
 2004 Dinocroc as Dr. Campell
 2004 Sue Thomas: F.B.Eye (Ep. "The Mentor") as Wes Kenner
 2003 The Practice (Ep. "Rape Shield") as District Attorney Robert Webb
 2003 ER (4 episodes) as Alderman John Bright
 2002-2003 The Guardian (2 episodes) as Jake's Father
 2002-2003 Judging Amy (5 episodes) as Martin
 2002 Third Watch (Ep. "Two Hundred and Thirty-Three Days") as Uncle Mike
 2002 Half Past Dead as Lester McKenna
 2001 Mach 2 as Phil Jefferson
 2001 Focus
 1999 The Wacky Adventures of Ronald McDonald: The Legend of Grimace Island as voice of Blather
 1998 Deep Impact as Stuart Caley, Jenny's Boss At MSNBC
 1997 Jag [The Guardian] as Navy Seal Chief Bowers
 1997 Velocity Trap
 1996 NYPD Blue S4 E6 Yes Sir, That's My Baby as Lawrence Curry 
 1996-1998 Superman: The Animated Series (4 Episodes) as voice of Bruno Mannheim
 1995 Her Hidden Truth as Lieutenant Ricky Levine
 1995 Murder, She Wrote S11 E5 Twice Dead as Dr. Max Franklin
 1995 Prehysteria! 3 as Hal MacGregor
 1995 Aaahh!!! Real Monsters (2 Episodes) as voices of Luxor / Porg
 1995 The X-Files (Ep. "Irresistible") as Moe Bocks
 1994 Batman: The Animated Series (Ep. "Lock-Up") as voice of Lock-Up
 1994 The Byrds of Paradise as Dr. Murray Rubenstein
 1994 Highlander: The Series (Ep. "The Fighter") as Tommy Sullivan
 1993 The Liars' Club as Jack
 1991-1992 Anything but Love as Mike Urbanek
 1990 Rainbow Drive as Dan Crawford
 1989 Midnight Caller (Ep. "Mercy Me") as Ed Adderly
 1989 A Cry for Help: The Tracey Thurman Story as Burton Weinstein
 1989 A Deadly Silence as Detective McCready
 1987-1988 Mama's Boy as Jake McCaskey
 1981-1987 Hill Street Blues as Detective Michael "Mick" Belker
 1981 Death of a Centerfold: The Dorothy Stratten Story as Paul Snider
 1978 Happy Days as Robert Clark
 1977 The Private Files of J. Edgar Hoover as Voice On Tape
 1977 Quincy M.E. as Boyd
 1976 Ryan's Hope as Assistant District Attorney Benjamin Levine
 1975 Columbo as Cook

References

External links

1943 births
20th-century American male actors
21st-century American Jews
21st-century American male actors
Actors from Norwalk, Connecticut
American male film actors
American male soap opera actors
American male television actors
Jewish American male actors
Living people
Male actors from Connecticut
Mayors of places in California
Outstanding Performance by a Supporting Actor in a Drama Series Primetime Emmy Award winners
People from Reseda, Los Angeles